Asthana, from Sanskrit, meaning a royal position or job, may refer to:

Asthana (moth), a synonym of the moth genus Deinopa
Asthana (clan), a clan of the Kayastha in India
Asthana Vidushi, an honorary title bestowed on a court musician or dancer in India
Asthana or Mandapa, a pillared hall or pavilion for public rituals

People
Anushka Asthana (born 1980), British journalist
Kunwar Bahadur Asthana (born 1915), Indian politician and judge
Nupur Asthana, Indian film director
Ragesh Asthana (1962–2014), Indian actor
Rakesh Asthana (born 1961), Indian police officer and administrator
Sanjay Asthana, doctor at the University of Wisconsin
Shabnam Asthana, Indian public relations person

See also
Astana, the capital of Kazakhstan